Stigmella palmatae is a moth of the family Nepticulidae. It is known from the China and the Russian Far East.

The larvae feed on Filipendula palmata. They mine the leaves of their host plant.

Nepticulidae
Moths of Asia
Moths described in 1984